Cultural heritage is the heritage of tangible and intangible heritage assets of a group or society that is inherited from past generations. Not all heritages of past generations are "heritage"; rather, heritage is a product of selection by society.

Cultural heritage includes tangible culture (such as buildings, monuments, landscapes, archive materials, books, works of art, and artifacts), intangible culture (such as folklore, traditions, language, and knowledge), and natural heritage (including culturally significant landscapes, and biodiversity). The term is often used in connection with issues relating to the protection of Indigenous intellectual property.

The deliberate act of keeping cultural heritage from the present for the future is known as preservation (American English) or conservation (British English), which cultural and historical ethnic museums and cultural centers promote, though these terms may have more specific or technical meanings in the same contexts in the other dialect. Preserved heritage has become an anchor of the global tourism industry, a major contributor of economic value to local communities.

Legal protection of cultural property comprises a number of international agreements and national laws.
United Nations, UNESCO and Blue Shield International deal with the protection of cultural heritage. This also applies to the integration of United Nations peacekeeping.

Types of heritage

Cultural property

Cultural property includes the physical, or "tangible" cultural heritage, such as artworks. These are generally split into two groups of movable and immovable heritage. Immovable heritage includes buildings (which themselves may include installed art such as organs, stained glass windows, and frescos), large industrial installations, residential projects or other historic places and monuments. Moveable heritage includes books, documents, moveable artworks, machines, clothing, and other artifacts, that are considered worthy of preservation for the future. These include objects significant to the archaeology, architecture, science or technology of a specified culture.

Aspects and disciplines of the preservation and conservation of tangible culture include:
 Museology
 Archival science
 Conservation (cultural heritage)
 Art conservation
 Archaeological conservation
 Architectural conservation
 Film preservation
 Phonograph record preservation
 Digital preservation

Intangible culture

"Intangible cultural heritage" consists of non-physical aspects of a particular culture, more often maintained by social customs during a specific period in history. The concept includes the ways and means of behavior in a society, and the often formal rules for operating in a particular cultural climate. These include social values and traditions, customs and practices, aesthetic and spiritual beliefs, artistic expression, language and other aspects of human activity. The significance of physical artifacts can be interpreted as an act against the backdrop of socioeconomic, political, ethnic, religious and philosophical values of a particular group of people. Naturally, intangible cultural heritage is more difficult to preserve than physical objects.

Aspects of the preservation and conservation of cultural intangibles include:

 folklore
 oral history
 language preservation

Natural heritage

"Natural heritage" is also an important part of a society's heritage, encompassing the countryside and natural environment, including flora and fauna, scientifically known as biodiversity, as well as geological elements (including mineralogical, geomorphological, paleontological, etc.), scientifically known as geodiversity. These kind of heritage sites often serve as an important component in a country's tourist industry, attracting many visitors from abroad as well as locally. Heritage can also include cultural landscapes (natural features that may have cultural attributes).

Aspects of the preservation and conservation of natural heritage include:
 Rare breeds conservation
 Heirloom plants

Protection of cultural heritage

History 
There have been examples of respect for the cultural assets of enemies since ancient times. The roots of today's legal situation for the precise protection of cultural heritage also lie in some of Austria's ruler Maria Theresa (1717 - 1780) decided Regulations and the demands of the Congress of Vienna (1814/15) not to remove works of art from their place of origin in the war. The process continued at the end of the 19th century when, in 1874 (in Brussels), at least a draft international agreement on the laws and customs of war was agreed. 25 years later, in 1899, an international peace conference was held in the Netherlands on the initiative of Tsar Nicholas II of Russia, with the aim of revising the declaration (which was never ratified) and adopting a convention. The Hague Conventions of 1899 and 1907 also significantly advanced international law and laid down the principle of the immunity of cultural property. Three decades later, in 1935, the preamble to the Treaty on the Protection of Artistic and Scientific Institutions (Roerich Pact) was formulated. On the initiative of UNESCO, the Hague Convention for the Protection of Cultural Property in the Event of Armed Conflict was signed in 1954.

Protection of cultural heritage or protection of cultural goods means all measures to protect cultural property against damage, destruction, theft, embezzlement or other loss. The term “monument protection” is also used for immovable cultural property. This relates in particular to the prevention of robbery digs at archaeological sites, the looting or destruction of cultural sites and the theft of works of art from churches and museums all over the world and basically measures regarding the conservation and general access to our common cultural heritage. Legal protection of cultural heritage comprises a number of international agreements and national laws, and these must also be implemented.

There is a close partnership between the UN, United Nations peacekeeping, UNESCO, the International Committee of the Red Cross and Blue Shield International.

The protection of the cultural heritage should also preserve the particularly sensitive cultural memory, the growing cultural diversity and the economic basis of a state, a municipality or a region. Whereby there is also a connection between cultural user disruption or cultural heritage and the cause of flight. But only through the fundamental cooperation, including the military units and the planning staff, with the locals can the protection of world heritage sites, archaeological finds, exhibits and archaeological sites from destruction, looting and robbery be implemented sustainably. The founding president of Blue Shield International Karl von Habsburg summed it up with the words: “Without the local community and without the local participants, that would be completely impossible”.

The ethics and rationale of cultural preservation 
Objects are a part of the study of human history because they provide a concrete basis for ideas, and can validate them. Their preservation demonstrates a recognition of the necessity of the past and of the things that tell its story. In The Past is a Foreign Country, David Lowenthal observes that preserved objects also validate memories. While digital acquisition techniques can provide a technological solution that is able to acquire the shape and the appearance of artifacts with an unprecedented precision in human history, the actuality of the object, as opposed to a reproduction, draws people in and gives them a literal way of touching the past. This, unfortunately, poses a danger as places and things are damaged by the hands of tourists, the light required to display them, and other risks of making an object known and available. The reality of this risk reinforces the fact that all artifacts are in a constant state of chemical transformation, so that what is considered to be preserved is actually changing – it is never as it once was. Similarly changing is the value each generation may place on the past and on the artifacts that link it to the past.

Classical civilizations, especially Indian, have attributed supreme importance to the preservation of tradition. Its central idea was that social institutions, scientific knowledge and technological applications need to use a "heritage" as a "resource". Using contemporary language, we could say that ancient Indians considered, as social resources, both economic assets (like natural resources and their exploitation structure) and factors promoting social integration (like institutions for the preservation of knowledge and for the maintenance of civil order). Ethics considered that what had been inherited should not be consumed, but should be handed over, possibly enriched, to successive generations. This was a moral imperative for all, except in the final life stage of sannyasa.

What one generation considers "cultural heritage" may be rejected by the next generation, only to be revived by a subsequent generation.

World heritage movement

Significant was the Convention Concerning the Protection of World Cultural and Natural Heritage that was adopted by the General Conference of UNESCO in 1972. As of 2011, there are 936 World Heritage Sites: 725 cultural, 183 natural, and 28 mixed properties, in 153 countries. Each of these sites is considered important to the international community.

The underwater cultural heritage is protected by the UNESCO Convention on the Protection of the Underwater Cultural Heritage. This convention is a legal instrument helping states parties to improve the protection of their underwater cultural heritage.

In addition, UNESCO has begun designating masterpieces of the Oral and Intangible Heritage of Humanity. The Committee on Economic, Social and Cultural Rights sitting as part of the United Nations Economic and Social Council with article 15 of its Covenant had sought to instill the principles under which cultural heritage is protected as part of a basic human right.

Key international documents and bodies include:
 Athens Charter, 1931
 Roerich Pact, 1935
 Hague Convention for the Protection of Cultural Property in the Event of Armed Conflict, 1954, (with a definition of cultural heritage item adopted by some national law)
 Venice Charter, 1964
 Barcelona Charter, 2002 (regarding maritime vessel preservation)
 ICOMOS
The Blue Shield, a network of committees of dedicated individuals across the world that is “committed to the protection of the world’s cultural property, and is concerned with the protection of cultural and natural heritage, tangible and intangible, in the event of armed conflict, natural- or human-made disaster.”
 International Institute for Conservation

The U.S. Government Accountability Office issued a report describing some of the United States’ cultural property protection efforts.

National and regional heritage movements

Much of heritage preservation work is done at the national, regional, or local levels of society. Various national and regional regimes include:
 Australia:
Burra Charter
Heritage Overlay in Victoria, Australia
 Brazil:
National Institute of Historic and Artistic Heritage 
 Canada
Heritage conservation in Canada
 Chile
National Monuments Council (Chile)
 China
State Administration of Cultural Heritage
 Egypt
 Supreme Council of Antiquities
 Estonia
 Ministry of Culture (Estonia)
 National Heritage Board (Estonia)
 Ghana
Ghana’s material cultural heritage
 Honduras
 Secretary of State for Culture, Arts and Sports
 Hong Kong
Heritage conservation in Hong Kong
 India
Ministry of Culture (India)
National Archives of India
Archaeological Survey of India
Anthropological Survey of India
Culture of India
Indian National Trust for Art and Cultural Heritage
National Museum Institute of the History of Art, Conservation and Museology
List of World Heritage Sites in India
Indian Heritage Cities Network, Mysore
Heritage structures in Hyderabad

 Iran
Cultural Heritage, Handcrafts and Tourism Organization
 Japan
Cultural Properties of Japan
 Kenya
National Museums of Kenya
International Inventories Programme
 Macedonia
 Institute for Protection of Cultural Monuments
 Malaysia
The National Heritage Act
 Namibia
National Heritage Council of Namibia
National Monuments Council
 New Zealand
New Zealand Historic Places Trust
 Pakistan
 Lahore Museum of Art and Cultural History
 Lok Virsa Heritage Museum
 National Museum of Pakistan
 Pakistan Monument and Heritage Museum
 Philippines
National Commission for Culture and the Arts
National Historical Commission of the Philippines
 Poland
National Ossoliński Institute 
 South Africa
South African Heritage Resources Agency
Provincial heritage resources authorities
Amafa aKwaZulu-Natali
Heritage Western Cape
Northern Cape Heritage Resources Authority
National Monuments Council
Historical Monuments Commission
 United Kingdom
Conservation in the United Kingdom
English Heritage
English Heritage Archive
National Trust
Cadw
Northern Ireland Environment Agency
Historic Environment Scotland
National Trust for Scotland
 United States of America
National Register of Historic Places

 Zambia

National Heritage Conservation Commission

National Museums Board

 Zimbabwe
National Monuments of Zimbabwe

Issues in cultural heritage 

Broad philosophical, technical, and political issues and dimensions of cultural heritage include:
 Cultural heritage repatriation
 Cultural heritage management
 Cultural property law
 Heritage tourism
 Virtual heritage
Sustainable preservation
Climate change and World Heritage

Management of cultural heritage 
Issues in cultural heritage management include:

 Exhibition of cultural heritage objects
 Radiography of cultural objects
 Storage of cultural heritage objects
Collections maintenance
Disaster preparedness

Cultural heritage digital preservation 
Ancient archaeological artefacts and archaeological sites are naturally prone to damage due to their age and environmental conditions. Also, there have been tragic occurrences of unexpected man-made disasters, such as in the cases of a fire that took place in the 200 years old National Museum of Brazil and the UNESCO World Heritage Site of the Notre Dame Cathedral in Paris.

Therefore, there is a growing need to digitize cultural heritage in order to preserve them in the face of potential calamities such as climate change, natural disaster, poor policy or inadequate infrastructure. For example, the Library of Congress has started to digitize its collections in a special program called the National Digital Library Program. The Smithsonian has also been actively digitizing its collection with the release of the “Smithsonian X 3D Explorer,” allowing anyone to engage with the digitized versions of the museum’s millions of artifacts, of which only two percent are on display.

3D scanning devices have become a practical reality in the field of heritage preservation. 3D scanners can produce a high-precision digital reference model that not only digitizes condition but also provides a 3D virtual model for replication. The high cost and relative complexity of 3D scanning technologies have made it quite impractical for many heritage institutions in the past, but this is changing, as technology advances and its relative costs are decreasing to reach a level where even mobile based scanning applications can be used to create a virtual museum.

There is still a low level of digital archiving of archaeological data obtained via excavation, even in the UK where the lead digital archive for archaeology, the Archaeology Data Service, was established in the 1990s. Across the globe, countries are at different stages of dealing with digital archaeological archives, all dealing with differences in statutory requirements, legal ownership of archives and infrastructure.

See also

 Antiquarian
 Architectural Heritage
 Collecting
 Heritage film
 International Council on Monuments and Sites
 Values (heritage)

Digital methods in preservation
 DigiCULT
 ERPANET
 Intellectual property issues in cultural heritage (IPinCH)

References

Further reading 
 Michael Falser. Cultural Heritage as Civilizing Mission. From Decay to Recovery. Heidelberg, New York: Springer (2015), .
 Michael Falser, Monica Juneja (eds.). 'Archaeologizing' Heritage? Transcultural Entanglements between Local Social Practices and Global Virtual Realities. Heidelberg, New York: Springer (2013), .
 
 Ann Marie Sullivan, Cultural Heritage & New Media: A Future for the Past, 15 J. MARSHALL REV. INTELL. PROP. L. 604 (2016) https://repository.jmls.edu/cgi/viewcontent.cgi?article=1392&context=ripl
 Barbara T. Hoffman, Art and cultural heritage: law, policy, and practice, Cambridge University Press, 2006
 Leila A. Amineddoleh, "Protecting Cultural Heritage by Strictly Scrutinizing Museum Acquisitions," Fordham Intellectual Property, Media & Entertainment Law Journal, Vol. 24, No. 3. Available at: https://ssrn.com/abstract=2467100 
 Paolo Davide Farah, Riccardo Tremolada, Desirability of Commodification of Intangible Cultural Heritage: The Unsatisfying Role of IPRs, in TRANSNATIONAL DISPUTE MANAGEMENT, Special Issues “The New Frontiers of Cultural Law: Intangible Heritage Disputes”, Volume 11, Issue 2, March 2014,  Available at: https://ssrn.com/abstract=2472339
 Paolo Davide Farah, Riccardo Tremolada, Intellectual Property Rights, Human Rights and Intangible Cultural Heritage, Journal of Intellectual Property Law, Issue 2, Part I, June 2014, Giuffrè, pp. 21–47. Available at: https://ssrn.com/abstract=2472388
 Nora Lafi, Building and Destroying Authenticity in Aleppo: Heritage between Conservation, Transformation, Destruction, and Re-Invention in Christoph Bernhardt, Martin Sabrow, Achim Saupe. Gebaute Geschichte. Historische Authentizität im Stadtraum, Wallstein, pp.206-228, 2017
 Dallen J. Timothy and Gyan P. Nyaupane, Cultural heritage and tourism in the developing world : a regional perspective, Taylor & Francis, 2009
 Peter Probst, "Osogbo and the Art of Heritage: Monuments, Deities, and Money", Indiana University Press, 2011
 Constantine Sandis (ed.), Cultural Heritage Ethics: Between Theory and Practice, Open Book Publishers, 2014
 Zuckermann, Ghil'ad et al., ENGAGING - A Guide to Interacting Respectfully and Reciprocally with Aboriginal and Torres Strait Islander People, and their Arts Practices and Intellectual Property, Australian Government: Indigenous Culture Support, 2015

 Kocój E., Między mainstremem a undergroundem. Dziedzictwo regionalne w kulturze europejskiej – odkrywanie znaczeń, [w:] Dziedzictwo kulturowe w regionach europejskich. Odkrywanie, ochrona i (re)interpretacja, Seria wydawnicza:, Studia nad dziedzictwem i pamięcią kulturową“, tom I, Kraków 2019, red. Ewa Kocój, Tomasz Kosiek, Joanna Szulborska-Łukaszewicz, pp. 10–35.
 Dziedzictwo kulturowe w regionach europejskich. Odkrywanie, ochrona i (re)interpretacja, Seria wydawnicza:, Studia nad dziedzictwem i pamięcią kulturową“, tom I, red. Ewa Kocój, Tomasz Kosiek, Joanna Szulborska-Łukaszewicz, Kraków 2019, p. 300.

External links

 Cultural heritage policy - history and resources Getty Museum - list of major international cultural heritage documents, charters, and treaties
 UNESCO World Heritage Centre – Official website of the United Nations organization for cultural heritage
 International Council on Monuments and Sites
 International Council of Museums
 International Centre for the Study of the Preservation and Restoration of Cultural Property
 Cultural routes and landscapes, a common heritage of Europe (English and French language)
 EPOCH – European Research Network on Excellence in Processing Open Cultural Heritage
 Peace Palace Library - Research Guide 
 National Council for Preservation Education
 Dédalo Open source management system for Cultural heritage
 

 
Museology
Conservation and restoration of cultural heritage
Articles containing video clips